The 2003 Vuelta a Castilla y León was the 18th edition of the Vuelta a Castilla y León cycle race and was held on 20 May to 24 May 2003. The race started in San Andrés del Rabanedo and finished in Ávila. The race was won by Francisco Mancebo.

Teams
Eighteen teams of up to eight riders started the race:

 
 
 
 
 
 
 
 
 Labarca 2–Cafés Baqué

General classification

References

Vuelta a Castilla y León
Vuelta a Castilla y León by year
2003 in Spanish sport